Alian may refer to:

Places in Iran
Alian or Aliyan or Alyan may refer to:

Alian, Semnan, a village in Semnan Province, Iran
Alian, Tehran, a village in Tehran Province, Iran
Alian, West Azerbaijan, a village in West Azerbaijan Province, Iran
Alian-e Sofla, a village in South Khorasan Province, Iran
Aliyan Rural District, in Gailan Province, Iran

Other uses

Ghassan Alian (born 1972), Israeli commander of the IDF Golani Brigade
Alians, a Shia order
Alian District, in Taiwan
Alians (band), a Polish punk-rock, reggae and ska band